Loyd "Pig" Arms (September 24, 1919 – June 18, 1999) was an American professional football player. He was born in Sulphur, Oklahoma, United States. Arms was drafted by the Chicago Bears in 1943, but he played his entire professional career (1946–1948) with the Chicago Cardinals.

Wrestling career
Arms was a high school wrestler in the state of Oklahoma during the late 1930s. He wrestled in the heavyweight division, and captured the Oklahoma state heavyweight title in both 1938 and 1939.

Following high school, Arms began wrestling at Oklahoma A&M University. He was named an All-American during his sophomore season in 1941. He placed third in the nation in the heavyweight division, after being pinned in the semifinals of the NCAA tournament.

Arms would make history the following season. As a junior, he won the NCAA National Championship in the heavyweight division. He spent the next three years in the Army defending his country in World War II.

After the conclusion of the war, Arms aimed to defend his title as the greatest heavyweight wrestler in the country. In the 1946 NCAA tournament, he was knocked out of title contention by George Bollas, a 300+ pound wrestler from Ohio State. Arms placed fourth, and was named an All-American for the third time.

NFL career
Arms was drafted by the Chicago Bears with the 129th overall selection of the 1943 NFL Draft, becoming the second player in the history of Oklahoma A&M to be drafted into the NFL. He would not play a game until the conclusion of World War II. In 1946 Arms began his NFL playing career with the Chicago Cardinals. He played in eight games, recorded five starts and is credited with one fumble recovery.

In 1947, Arms started all 12 games at the left guard position for the eventual NFL Champion Chicago Cardinals. The Cardinals defeated the Philadelphia Eagles 28–21 in the 1947 NFL Championship game, to earn the franchise's second NFL Championship (1925). The Cardinals franchise has not won a championship since that day, the longest active drought of any NFL team.

The following season, Arms appeared in seven games (two starts) with the Chicago Cardinals. The Cardinals finished the season 11–1, eventually losing a 7–0 battle to the Philadelphia Eagles in the 1948 NFL Championship Game. Following the '48 season, Arms retired from the NFL.

Arms was mentioned on page 268 of Howard Robert's book, "The Story of Pro Football" written in 1953. When discussing the 1947 Chicago Cardinals championship season, Johnson describes Arms as one of the "potent guards" who helped block for the "dream backfield" that led the Cardinals to the championship.

Death
Arms died on June 18, 1999; he was 79 years old. He is buried in the Riverside National Cemetery in Riverside, California.

References

External links
 

Burials at Riverside National Cemetery
Chicago Cardinals players
People from Sulphur, Oklahoma
1919 births
1999 deaths
United States Army personnel of World War II